The Quebec Liberal Party won seventy-two out of one hundred and eight seats in the 1970 Quebec provincial election, winning a majority government under Robert Bourassa's leadership. Information about these candidates may be found on this page.

Candidates

Labelle: Benoît Robidoux
Benoît Robidoux received 2,922 votes (21.65%), finishing second against Union Nationale incumbent Fernand Lafontaine.

References

1970